Nallajerla mandal is one of the 19 mandals in East Godavari district of the Indian state of Andhra Pradesh having population of 80,388 as of 2011 census. It is administered under Eluru revenue division and its headquarters are located at Nallajerla.

Towns and villages 

 census, the mandal has 12 settlements. Nallajerla is the most populated and Chodavaram is the least populated village in the mandal.

The settlements in the mandal are listed below:

See also 
East Godavari district

References

Mandals in East Godavari district